Declan Marmion  (b. 1961) is an Irish Marist priest and theologian. He is currently Professor of Theology at St. Patrick’s College, Maynooth.

Biography 
Training as a Marist priest, he was educated at the University of Passau, Germany, and the Milltown Institute, Dublin. Marmion also studied at Heythrop College, University of London, All Hallows College, Dublin, Trinity College, Dublin and the Catholic University of Leuven, Belgium.

He lectured in theology at the Milltown Institute of Theology and Philosophy, before joining the staff of Maynooth College in 2013. He served as Dean of theology from 2015 to 2021.

Marimon has written on theology and the church, and contributed to many publications, and academic journals including Louvain Studies and Milltown Studies, and also written articles for the Irish Catholic and the Irish Times.

Marimon has been the chief editor of the Irish Theological Quarterly since 2013. He also serves as one of the series editor of Studies in Theology, Society and Culture, published by Peter Lang.

Comments at funeral of Sean Fagan
At the funeral mass of his fellow Marist priest and theologian Fr Sean Fagan, Marimon spoke out against the church's treatment and censuring of Fagan, and the absence of Bishops from his funeral.

Works
 A Spirituality of Everyday Faith by Declan Marmion, Eerdmans Publishing Company, (1998).
 Christian Identity in a Postmodern Age, Edited by Declan Marmion Veritas, Dublin, (2005).
 An Introduction to the Trinity  by Declan Marmion and Rik Van Nieuwenhove, Cambridge University Press, (2010).
 Remembering the Reformation: Martin Luther and Catholic Theology, editors Declan Marmion, Salvador Ryan and  Gesa E Thiessen, Fortress Press, (2017).

References

1961 births
Living people
Place of birth missing (living people)
20th-century Irish Roman Catholic priests
21st-century Irish Roman Catholic theologians
Academics of St Patrick's College, Maynooth
21st-century Irish Roman Catholic priests
20th-century Irish Roman Catholic theologians
University of Passau alumni
Alumni of Milltown Institute of Theology and Philosophy
Alumni of Heythrop College
Alumni of All Hallows College, Dublin
Alumni of Trinity College Dublin
KU Leuven alumni